Piotr Starzyński (born 22 January 2004) is a Polish professional footballer who plays as a winger for Wisła Kraków.

References

External links
 
 

Living people
2004 births
Sportspeople from Katowice
Association football midfielders
Polish footballers
Poland youth international footballers
Poland under-21 international footballers
Wisła Kraków players
Ekstraklasa players